Marco Wegener (born 15 August 1995) is a Hong Kong professional footballer of partial German descent who currently plays as a defender for Hong Kong Premier League club Rangers.

Youth career
Wegener played his high school football at La Salle College. In 2011, he scored the lone goal in a 1–0 victory over Diocesan Boys' School in the Hong Kong Inter-School Football Competition quarterfinals.

Club career
In 2014, Wegener graduated into the first team of Rangers, making his debut in a 4–1 loss to Dreams Metro Gallery. He trains with the first team while completing his Associate Degree at Hong Kong Poly.

On 5 August 2017, Wegener was announced as a player for Lee Man.

On 24 July 2018, Hoi King confirmed the trial of Wegener. In the end, the player elected  not to sign with the club in order to continue his university education in Australia.

On 10 September 2022, Wegener returned to Rangers after 5 years.

International career
Wegener received his first call-up to the Hong Kong under-19 team during 2014 AFC U-19 Championship qualification. On 15 July 2016 he was selected to the Hong Kong under-20 squad for the under-21 National Quadrangular Football Tournament in Singapore.

Personal life
Wegener's father is German while his mother is a Hong Konger. He was a flag bearer for the 2006 FIFA World Cup quarter final match between Germany and Argentina.

References

External links
 Marco Wegener at HKFA
 

1995 births
Hong Kong people
Hong Kong footballers
Hong Kong people of German descent
Hong Kong Premier League players
Hong Kong Rangers FC players
Lee Man FC players
Living people
Association football midfielders
Association football defenders